Ivan Gospodinov Iliev (born 16 November 1955) is a Bulgarian former footballer who played as a defender and made 21 appearances for the Bulgaria national team.

Career
Iliev made his debut for Bulgaria on 21 September 1977 in a 1977–80 Balkan Cup match against Turkey, which finished as a 3–1 win. He went on to make 21 appearances, scoring 1 goal, before making his last appearance on 7 September 1982 in a friendly match against Switzerland, which finished as a 2–3 loss.

Career statistics

International

International goals

References

External links
 
 
 

1955 births
Living people
Bulgarian footballers
Bulgaria under-21 international footballers
Bulgaria international footballers
Association football defenders
PFC Slavia Sofia players
FC Dimitrovgrad players
First Professional Football League (Bulgaria) players
People from General Toshevo